Managnese(II) titanate is an inorganic compound with the chemical formula MnTiO3.

References

Manganese(II) compounds
Titanates